Gary Gerstle  (born 1954) is an American historian and academic. He is the Paul Mellon Professor of American History at the University of Cambridge, and a Fellow of Sidney Sussex College.

Early life
Gary Gerstle received his BA from Brown University in 1976 and his PhD from Harvard University in 1982.

Academic career
Gerstle taught at Catholic University of America and Princeton University, before moving to the University of Maryland, where he was Director of the Center for Historical Studies (2000–2003) and Chair of the Department of History (2003–2006). He joined the Department of History faculty at Vanderbilt University in Nashville, Tennessee in 2006. In the 2012/2013 academic year, he was the Harmsworth Visiting Professor of American History at the University of Oxford. As of October 2014, he is Paul Mellon Professor of American History at the University of Cambridge.

He is one of the USA's leading historians of race, citizenship and American nationhood. A historian of the twentieth-century United States, he is particularly interested in three major areas of inquiry: 1) immigration, race, and nationality; 2) the significance of class in social and political life; and 3) social movements, popular politics, and the state. Gerstle is the author, co-author, or co-editor of six books and the author of more than thirty articles on these topics.

He has served as the Annenberg Visiting Professor at the University of Pennsylvania and as a Visiting Professor at the École des Hautes Études en Sciences Sociale in Paris. In addition to France, he has lectured throughout the United States and in Canada, England, Belgium, Germany, the Netherlands, Italy, Brazil, Japan, and South Africa. Gerstle has also lectured widely to the general public, and is often consulted by newspaper reporters, magazine writers, and television producers on matters pertinent to his areas of historical expertise. In May 2007, Gerstle testified on questions of immigration before the Immigration Subcommittee of the House Judiciary Committee on Capitol Hill.

He also co-edits a book series, Politics and Society in Twentieth-Century America, which has published more than thirty books, many of them prizewinners. He has served on the editorial board of the Journal of American History and the Board of Editors of the American Historical Review.
He is a member of the Editorial Board for Past & Present.

Honors
His book, American Crucible, received the 2001 Theodore Saloutos Memorial Book Award for outstanding book on US immigration and ethnic history and was named by NPR book critic, Maureen Corrigan, one of 2008's Best Books for a Transformative New Year. He has received numerous fellowships, including a John Simon Guggenheim Memorial Fellowship, a National Endowment for the Humanities Fellowship, and a Membership at the Institute for Advanced Study in Princeton, New Jersey.

He was elected to the Society of American Historians in 2005  and named a Distinguished Lecturer of the Organization of American Historians in 2007. In July 2017, he was elected a Fellow of the British Academy (FBA), the United Kingdom's national academy for the humanities and social sciences.

Books

Solely authored works
 
  Includes a new preface.

Co-authored and co-edited works

References

External links

 Gary Gerstle's faculty page at Cambridge University
 Cambridge American History Seminar
 Princeton University Press book series, Politics and Society in Twentieth Century America
  A four-part radio series hosted by Gerstle.

1954 births
21st-century American historians
American male non-fiction writers
Brown University alumni
Catholic University of America School of Arts and Sciences faculty
Fellows of Sidney Sussex College, Cambridge
Fellows of the British Academy
Harold Vyvyan Harmsworth Professors of American History
Harvard University alumni
Historians of the United States
Living people
Members of the University of Cambridge faculty of history
Princeton University faculty
University of Maryland, College Park faculty
Vanderbilt University faculty
21st-century American male writers
Professors of the University of Cambridge